Nikos Mirtsekis (born 4 April 1968) is a Greek former professional footballer who played as a striker.

Club career
Mirtsekis  started playing football at the age of 12 at the academies of Panionios. He was promoted to the men's team in 1987, but did not compete in any league matches. The following season he was loaned to Kalamata, in the third division, and returned to the club of Nea Smyrni in 1989. He made his debut on December 3 and played for Panionios until 1994.

In the summer of 1994 he transferred to the then champion, AEK Athens for the fee of 70 milion drachmas. He played in the UEFA Champions League match against Ajax on 28 September. However, he failed to establish himself in the squad and was transferred to Iraklis, where he emerged as the team's main goalscorer over the next two seasons, helping the club to 6th and 4th place finishes and a participation in the UEFA Cup. The third season didn't go too well, it was also his conscription period, and he was eventually released from Iraklis. In 1997, he signed for Aris, which had been relegated to the second division and he helped them to return to the first division, before he retired professionally at the end of the season in 1998. He returned in 2009 playing at an amateur level at Olympiacos Argostoli until 2011.

International career
Mirtsekis was called to the Greece in 1992, when the coach, Antonis Georgiadis, made a renewal in the team's roster. He played only in one friendly match on February 12 in a 1–0 win against Romania, held in Ioannina, when he came on as a substitute at the 75th minute.

He was also called to the Military team. where he won the World Military Cup in 1997.

After football
Mirtsekis , left the Greece, went to the United States, where he played futsal for a few years in clubs of Chicago and worked as a coach in academies for children, such as West Virginia Soccer Club, Barrington Soccer Club, Hinsdale Harricane and Concordia, while for a time he ran the "Niko Mirtsekis Soccer Camps". He also worked in the Illinois State Olympic program and refereed. , although since 2009 he has returned to Greece, in Kefalonia, where he worked in the football academies of the local Olympiacos and competed in their first team. He works at the Olympiacos academies in Chicago, Olympiacos Chicago Soccer Schools.

Personal life
Mirtsekis is married and has two boys, who all live in Chicago.

Honours

Greece Military
World Military Cup: 1997

Aris
Beta Ethniki: 1997–98

References

External links

1968 births
Living people
Panionios F.C. players
Kalamata F.C. players
AEK Athens F.C. players
Iraklis Thessaloniki F.C. players
Aris Thessaloniki F.C. players
Association football forwards
Super League Greece players
Greece international footballers
Footballers from Athens
Greek footballers